The men's triple jump was a track and field athletics event held as part of the athletics at the 1904 Summer Olympics programme. It was the third time the event was held. Seven athletes, all from the United States, participated. The competition was held on Thursday, September 1, 1904.

Myer Prinstein successfully defended his Olympic championship in the event, though was unable to better his previous Olympic record distance of 14.47 metres. He was the first to successfully defend (himself beating the 1896 champion, James Brendan Connolly, in 1900) and the second to receive two medals of any color (after Connolly). With only American competitors, the second consecutive U.S. medal sweep was inevitable.

Background

This was the third appearance of the event, which is one of 12 athletics events to have been held at every Summer Olympics. Myer Prinstein of the United States, the defending champion, was the only jumper to return after the 1900 Games. There was no favorite as "the event was rarely held".

No nations made their debut in the event, as only the United States competed. The United States competed for the third time, having competed at each of the Games so far.

Competition format

There was a single round of jumping.

Records

These were the standing world and Olympic records (in metres) prior to the 1904 Summer Olympics.

(*) unofficial

No new world or Olympic records were set during the competition.

Schedule

Results

References

Sources
 

Athletics at the 1904 Summer Olympics
Triple jump at the Olympics